Gulli (Kaitag: Гьулли; Dargwa: Хӏурри) is a rural locality (a selo) in Kaytagsky District, Republic of Dagestan, Russia. The population was 2,056 as of 2010. There are 6 streets.

Geography 
Gulli is located 20 km northwest of Madzhalis (the district's administrative centre) by road. Chumli and Kapkaykent are the nearest rural localities.

Nationalities 
Dargins live there.

References 

Rural localities in Kaytagsky District